Osman Hadžić (born 9 September 1966) is a Bosnian folk singer.

Discography
Lažu oči zelene (1990)
Nikad više snježana (1991)
Za njom plaću crne oči (1993)
Obriši suze baksuze (1994)
Nije čudo što te volim ludo (1999)
Ostarit ćemo (2000)
Prezime (2002)
Zbog ljubavi (2005)
I ovako i onako (2007)
Poljubi me (2009) ft. Sabrina
Ponovo se volimo (2011)

References

External links
Official website

1966 births
Living people
Bosniaks of Bosnia and Herzegovina
Bosnia and Herzegovina folk-pop singers
20th-century Bosnia and Herzegovina male singers
21st-century Bosnia and Herzegovina male singers